Pterocephalidium is a monotypic genus of flowering plants belonging to the family Caprifoliaceae. The only species is Pterocephalidium diandrum.

The species is found in Iberian Peninsula.

References

Caprifoliaceae
Caprifoliaceae genera
Monotypic Asteraceae genera